The San Luis Obispo Botanical Garden is a botanical garden located in the rolling hills of El Chorro Regional Park,  between San Luis Obispo and Morro Bay in San Luis Obispo County, within the Central Coast of California region. Its grounds, when completed, will be a  collection of gardens displaying the diverse plant life of the five Mediterranean climate zones of the world; the Mediterranean Basin, and regions of California, Chile, Australia, and South Africa.

History
The first idea for the garden began in 1989, and in 1991 the Friends of SLO Botanical Garden was incorporated. The  Preview Garden was opened in 1997. The master plan was completed in 1998, as was the greenhouse and nursery. The  green, sustainably-built educational center was opened in 2007.

Work is ongoing to build the entire garden. When complete, the San Luis Obispo Botanical Garden will be one of the largest botanical gardens in the Western United States.

Gardens

Mediterranean gardens
The San Luis Obispo Botanical Garden is developing gardens of the five ecoregions in the Mediterranean forests, woodlands, and scrub Biome:

 The California chaparral and woodlands garden will be  with nine collections: oak woodland, mixed evergreen forest, grassland, coastal scrub, chaparral, sycamore glen, agave-yucca rise, riparian forest and wetland. It will display specimens from Baja California northward to a point about halfway between San Francisco and Eureka.
 The Mediterranean Basin garden  will be organized into three collections; oasis, Canary Island crest, and Mediterranean slope.
 The Chilean Matorral garden  will be devoted to the flora of central Chile with seven separate collections; araucaria crest, southern beech forest, coastal matorral, puya palisades, Chilean arroyo, Chilean mixed forest and Chilean palm grove.
 The Cape Province-Western Cape of South Africa garden  will contain three collections: Cape succulents (the Cape of Good Hope area is home to the richest succulent flora in the world), floral carpet of the Cape and a tapestry of diverse vegetation woven into a continuous shrub land.
 The Southwest Australia garden  will hold four collections from two areas of Australia; a garden of the protea family, kwongan (small groupings of eucalyptus woodlands and associated thickets), karri, marri, and jarrah forest (a display of giant eucalyptus trees that rank among the tallest trees in the world) and grass tree slope.

Theme gardens
 The Orchard, Vineyard and Entry Plantings  will highlight plants of economic importance: orchards of grapes, walnuts, pistachios, olives and other productive plants of the Mediterranean climate areas with naturalized flowering ground covers from each region. It will also include an avenue of Mediterranean cypress intermixed with a broad leaf evergreen canopy lines the entry road.
 The Gardens of Exploration  will contain groupings of demonstration gardens. Five general areas have been identified: horticultural therapy, ecology, biology, cultural influences and horticultural opportunities.

See also 
 List of California native plants
 Index: Mediterranean forests, woodlands, and scrub – biome, ecoregions, and flora.
 List of botanical gardens in the United States

External links
official San Luis Obispo Botanical Garden homepage

Botanical gardens in California
Parks in San Luis Obispo County, California